John Steel (10 November 1898 – 4 August 1941) was a New Zealand rugby union player. A wing, Steel represented West Coast and Canterbury at a provincial level, and was a member of the New Zealand national side, the All Blacks, from 1920 to 1925. He played 38 matches for the All Blacks including six internationals, and captained the side on two occasions.

References

1898 births
1941 deaths
People from the West Coast, New Zealand
New Zealand rugby union players
New Zealand international rugby union players
West Coast rugby union players
Canterbury rugby union players
Rugby union wings
New Zealand hoteliers